Brigadier Harold Evelyn William Bell Kingsley CIE DSO (23 December 1885 – 15 April 1970) was Commandant of the Indian Military Academy (1936-1939) and Aide-de-camp to King George VI.

Early life
Harold Evelyn William Bell Kingsley was born 23 December 1885 in Nenagh, Ireland.  He was the son of Col. William Henry Bell Kingsley CB and his wife, Mrs Kingsley, of River View, Nenagh, Co. Tipperary. He was educated at Bedford Modern School and the Royal Military College, Sandhurst.

Career
After Sandhurst, Kingsley joined the Indian Army.  He was appointed Captain on 18 January 1914 and Major on 18 January 1920.  During World War I, Kingsley served in Mesopotamia (1916–18) and in the Balkans (1918). He served in Russia, and Trans-Caspia (1919), the Black Sea and Turkey (1919–20) and Waziristan (1921–24).  He was made Colonel in 1933.

Kingsley was Deputy Military Secretary, Army Headquarters, India (1933–36).  He was Commandant of the Indian Military Academy between 1936 and 1939 and ADC to the King (1938–39).  He retired in 1939.

Awards and honours
Kingsley was mentioned in despatches during World War I and on service in Waziristan (1921–24).  He was made DSO in 1917 and CIE in 1939.

Personal life
Kinglsey was a member of the Army and Navy Club.  In 1926 he married Hon. Olive Mary Kitson, daughter of James Kitson, 1st Baron Airedale; they lived at Warnford House, Warnford, Hampshire.  There were no children from the marriage and Kingsley died in Hampshire on 15 April 1970.

References

Companions of the Distinguished Service Order
People educated at Bedford Modern School
1885 births
1970 deaths
Companions of the Order of the Indian Empire
British Indian Army officers
Graduates of the Royal Military College, Sandhurst
Indian Army personnel of World War I
Commandants of Indian Military Academy